Choe Song-hyok (born February 8, 1998) is a North Korean professional footballer who plays as a midfielder for the North Korean national team.

Club career

Youth career
Choe started out with Chobyong, a North Korean academy known for developing young talent. Choe signed with Italian club Fiorentina in February 2016, joining the Primavera (under-19) squad. On March 5, he made his debut for Fiorentina Primavera, during a 4–2 victory over Virtus Entella U19. In doing so, he became the first North Korean footballer to ever make an appearance for an Italian club at any level.

However, problems related to his nationality quickly began arising, and he only made three more appearances with the team. It was reported that the North Korean regime had placed strict restrictions on him during his time abroad. In addition to them keeping his travel documents, he was not allowed to use the internet, nor have relations with the media or teammates, unless directly related to football. Additionally, it was rumored that his signing bonus and 70% of his future salary would be repatriated to his home country. For this reason, in May, the Italian Parliament requested that the government review the contract. The following month, Fiorentina decided to terminate his contract. Choe took the matter to court, and the Italian Football Federation ruled that the club was obligated to continue honoring the contract. Subsequently, Fiorentina appealed to the Court of Arbitration for Sport, arguing that the contract should be invalidated because they were not aware that it violated international sanctions at the time of its signing.

Professional career
In July 2017, Choe signed a three-year deal with Serie B side Perugia.

After only two appearances with the club (both with the under-19 squad), Choe was loaned out to fellow Serie C side Olbia in January 2018. He made his long-awaited professional debut on February 25, replacing Roberto Biancu in the late minutes of a 1–0 defeat to Robur Siena.

On 13 July 2018, he signed with another Serie C club Arezzo. He made just 2 appearances in the league (16 minutes of field time) in the next 1.5-years, and on 31 January 2020, his Arezzo contract was terminated by mutual consent.

International career
Choe gained prominence by leading the North Korea U16s to a first-place finish at the 2014 AFC U-16 Championship, scoring the game-winning strike against South Korea in the final.

Choe was also named to the North Korea U-17 national team that competed in the North Korea U17 squad at the 2015 FIFA U-17 World Cup, where he made four appearances. However, North Korea was knocked off in the round of 16 by Mali.

He earned two caps for the national under-19 team at the 2016 AFC U-19 Championship, and two more at the 2018 AFC U-23 Championship.

He made his debut for his nation's senior squad on 25 December 2018 in a friendly against Vietnam.

Honours

International
North Korea U16
 AFC U-16 Championship: 2014

References

External links
 
 
 

Living people
North Korean footballers
North Korea youth international footballers
North Korea international footballers
North Korean expatriate footballers
Association football midfielders
Olbia Calcio 1905 players
S.S. Arezzo players
Serie C players
2019 AFC Asian Cup players
North Korean expatriate sportspeople in Italy
Expatriate footballers in Italy
Sportspeople from Pyongyang
1998 births